Alloschemone occidentalis is a flowering plant in genus Alloschemone of the arum family Araceae.

It was once included in Scindapsus, but was re-classified into Alloschemone.

Distribution 
Its native range is north Brazil to Bolivia.

References 

Monsteroideae